Allegheny Post Office, also known as Old North Post Office, The Landmarks Museum, is a building built in 1897 in the Allegheny City area that is now within Pittsburgh, Pennsylvania.  It is located in Pittsburgh's North Side.

The building was listed on the National Register of Historic Places in 1971.

In 1983, the post office building became the first home of the Children's Museum of Pittsburgh.  The Children's Museum has since expanded to include the neighboring Buhl Planetarium building and a new addition.

References

External links

Post office buildings on the National Register of Historic Places in Pennsylvania
Government buildings completed in 1897
Government buildings in Pittsburgh
City of Pittsburgh historic designations
Pittsburgh History & Landmarks Foundation Historic Landmarks
Historic American Buildings Survey in Pennsylvania
National Register of Historic Places in Pittsburgh